Portage Place is a mixed-use shopping centre located in downtown Winnipeg, Manitoba, Canada. Covering , it is located on the north side of Portage Avenue, between Vaughan and Carlton Streets and opened in September 1987.

History

In the early 1980s, north Portage Avenue was in decline, due in part to the "flight to the suburbs" and free parking at suburban malls. The federal, provincial, and municipal governments joined together to create the Core Area Initiative in 1981 to counter this decline, and rebuild this part of downtown. One of the proposals in 1983 to "fix" the north side of Portage Avenue was to realign the roadway and build a new arena; however, this proposal was rejected by City Council.

In 1983, the North Portage Development Corporation (now the Forks North Portage Partnership) was established as an arms-length government committee to develop residential, commercial, entertainment, and educational facilities in the North Portage region. The following year, the Corporation announced the building of the mall, which included the apartments behind it, known as "The Promenade". Signers included Member of Parliament Lloyd Axworthy, and Mayor Bill Norrie. By the summer of 1985, buildings within the land area of Portage Place were demolished and construction took place throughout 1986, being completed the following year, in 1987. The mall opened on September 17, 1987.

The cost total cost of the project was $80 million (equivalent to $157 million in 2019).

By the summer of 1988, barely a year after it opened, there were doubts of the shopping centre's success. Originally The Bay and Eaton's had extended their hours early in the week to encourage people to shop there, but the shoppers stayed away. Instead, it became a hangout for young people. Some store owners in the shopping centre said that after 5:30 p.m. there was a big drop in customers visiting the mall, and some tenants wanted their rent reduced.

An October 2007 Dominion Bond Rating Service (DBRS) report on Portage Place observed that "the property’s cash flow has continued to be depressed" amid declining average contractual rental rates, and that "the cash flow of the property may therefore not be enough to cover its refinance debt service." DBRS also noted, however, that the owners have "displayed [a] commitment to the property and DBRS doubts that it will be willing to lose control of its investment in lieu of injecting cash equity to reduce the refinance obligation."

In 2010, Portage Place converted 13 units of retail space totalling  to office space. The change was planned as a result of a 15% vacancy rate. The units chosen for conversion were those in the west wing of the second floor.

The IMAX Theatre in Portage Place closed on March 31, 2013. The 276-seat theatre endured several years of substantial losses before its closure. Globe Cinema closed on June 15, 2014.

In July 2019, Portage Place was sold to Starlight Investments, who paid $22.9 million for the shopping centre and $47 million for the land and underground parkade. Starlight announced an extensive refurbishment of the mall, with new residential, business, and retail units, reconfiguring the existing outdated design.

Construction was scheduled to begin in 2021; However, on September 29th, 2021, Starlight Developments informed The Forks North Portage Partnership, and Winnipeg City Council that they will not proceed with purchasing Portage Place, and have asked for their deposit back, hindering any re-development plans.

Layout

Portage Place spans three floors, totalling . The only remaining anchor store is currently Shoppers Drug Mart as Staples closed in 2020. Portage Place is also known for being a central hub of the Winnipeg Walkway, connecting to Cityplace, Canada Life Centre, and to the now empty Hudson's Bay. There are shops located on the skywalks, as well.

In 2013, Service Canada moved their downtown Winnipeg office onto the first floor of Portage Place.

The shopping centre includes three glass skylight atria, two of which are located at the intersections of both Portage and Kennedy, and Portage and Edmonton.

Edmonton court clock 
The Edmonton atrium is home to a clock tower, known as the Edmonton Court Clock. Originally unveiled in 1903 to be placed in the dome of City Hall, the clock was unveiled for a second time in Portage Place in 1987 after the old city hall was torn down. 

The original city hall clock had four clock faces, each  in diameter and made of crushed glass. The original weights used to balance the pendulum weighed  each.

With the Seth Thomas Clock Company as the clockmaker, the contract to procure and install the clock was awarded to local jeweller George Andrew of Andrew and Co.

The city hall building that the clock was built for was demolished in 1961. In the 1980s, parts of the clock were moved to Portage Place. The faces and hands of the current clock are replicas of the originals; the bells are also not from the 1903 clock, and the chimes are now electronic. At Portage Place, the clock was inoperable for a number of years due to damage from a contractor and later due to damage from a member of the public.

References

Further reading

External links

 

Shopping malls in Manitoba
Shopping malls established in 1987
1987 establishments in Manitoba
Buildings and structures in downtown Winnipeg